The 1974 All-Ireland Senior Club Camogie Championship for the leading clubs in the women's team field sport of camogie was won by St Paul’s from Kilkenny, who defeated Oranmore from Galway in the final, played at Ballinderrin .

Arrangements
The championship was organised on the traditional provincial system used in Gaelic Games since the 1880s, with Portglenone and University College Cork winning the championships of the other two provinces. Angela Downey scored 4–3 for St Paul’s, who had 11 of the Kilkenny senior panel to select from, in the semi-final against Portglenone at Nowlan Park. The UCC-Oranmore semi-final was played a s curtain raiser to the All-Ireland club football semi-final between Nemo Rangers and Lurgan’s Clanna Gael.

Downeys’ journey
The Downey twins traveled to Kilkeel Co Down from Kilkenny to play in the Al-Ireland colleges semi-final, via Monaghan (because a cross country team from St Brigid’s Callan was competing in the schools championship) and played in Callan’s one point win over Kilkeel. They then set out for Ballinderrin, near Craughwell in Co Galway to play for St Paul’s in the final of the club championship. Again the twins played an important part in their team’s victory and Angela scored St Pauls’ second goal

The Final
Mary Conway scored two goals for St Paul’s, who were held 1-0 to 1-0 at half-time. Agnes Hourigan wrote in the Irish Press: In a closely contested first half the visitors got the fillip of an early goal when they were facing a stiff breeze and though the home side made plenty of raids on the St Pauls‘ defence they failed to register a score until Josie Kelly sent a neat pass to Pat Feeney, who netted to make the score one goal each, and so it remained until half-time. Kilkenny now with the wind advantage were quickly on the offensive and added a goal and a point.

Final stages

References

External links
 Camogie Association

1974 in camogie
1974